für'n Arsch is the debut album by the German punk rock band Wizo. "für'n Arsch" (lit. "for the ass") is a vulgar expression meaning "in vain".

Track listing
"Diese Welt" (This World)  – 2:59
"I want You to be ma girl"  – 2:28
"Gute Freunde" (Good Friends)  – 4:04
"Good Bye"  – 2:57
"Der Käfer" (The Beetle)  – 0:28
"Kadett B"  – 2:28
"K.I.K.III" (N.I.S.III)  – 2:13
"Kein Gerede" (No Bullshitting)  – 2:45
"Walter"  – 3:59
"Jupp"  – 1:19
"Selenbrant" (Burning Souls)  – 3:27
"Unemployed"  – 2:01
"Sylvia"  – 3:32

References

1991 debut albums
Wizo albums